This is a list of the Mayors and Lord Mayors of the City of Darwin local government area, Darwin, Northern Territory, Australia.

Mayors (1915–1980)

Lord Mayors (since 1980)

References
 

Darwin

Mayors